Richard de Rochemont (December 13, 1903 – August 2, 1982) was an American documentary filmmaker in the late 1940s, who worked on the March of Time newsreel series.

Richard was born in Boston, Massachusetts in 1903. He attended Harvard University and started his film career as a foreign editor for Fox Movietone News (1930-1934). He was the brother of documentary filmmaker and feature film producer Louis de Rochemont.

Stationed in France until 1941, Richard de Rochemont produced a series of shorts which covered subjects like World War II, the 1920s, and the Vatican. He produced Crusade in Europe (1949), the very first documentary series produced for television, based on the book by Dwight D. Eisenhower, produced by Time Inc., and distributed by Twentieth Century-Fox Television. He also won a Best Documentary Short Academy Award for A Chance to Live (1949). In 1952 he produced various films on Lincoln. In 1955 de Rochemont founded his own film production company, Vavin Incorporated.
The company produced instructional films for organizations like Reader's digest and the French Tourist Office between the 1950s and 1980s.

In 1943, de Rochemont became the president of France Forever and continued his action until after the Liberation, giving way to Doctor Albert Simard.

References

External links

Richard de Rochemont papers at the University of Wyoming - American Heritage Center

1903 births
1982 deaths
American documentary filmmakers
People from Boston
Film directors from Massachusetts
Harvard College alumni